Tomorrow's Youth is a 1934 American film directed by Charles Lamont.

Cast
Dickie Moore as Thomas Hall Jr
Martha Sleeper as Mrs. Hall
John Miljan as Tom Hall
Franklin Pangborn as Tutor
Paul Hurst as Detective
Gloria Shea as Janes Holsworth
Jane Darwell as Mary
Barbara Bedford as Miss Booth
Harry C. Bradley as School Principal
Niles Welch as Attorney
Edward LeSaint as Judge

External links

1934 films
1934 drama films
American black-and-white films
Films directed by Charles Lamont
Monogram Pictures films
American drama films
1930s English-language films
1930s American films